Richard Matthews (21 November 1952 – 3 March 2013) was a South African wildlife filmmaker, television producer, television director and cameraman. Matthews spent more than twenty years as a documentary filmmaker for the BBC Natural History Unit. His notable credits included the 2013 BBC television series, Africa, featuring Sir David Attenborough. Matthews won three Emmy Awards and one British Academy of Film and Television Arts (BAFTA) award for his work on wildlife programming.

Matthews lived in Bristol, England, for much of his life, as his former home was located near the BBC Natural History Unit's headquarters on Whiteladies Road. His production company created the "Nighmares of Nature" show for the BBC. He and his family had moved to Cape Town, South Africa in 2004. He specialized in aerial film shots following his return to South Africa.

Richard Matthews was killed in a small plane crash on 3 March 2013, while filming aerial footage in over the Damaraland area of Kunene Region, Namibia. His pilot, Mark Berry, was also killed in the crash.

References

External links

2013 deaths
BBC television producers
Emmy Award winners
BAFTA winners (people)
British documentary film directors
South African documentary film directors
Documentary film producers
Film people from Bristol
People from Cape Town
British emigrants to South Africa
Victims of aviation accidents or incidents in Namibia
Year of birth unknown
1952 births